Lychnothamnus barbatus is a species of alga belonging to the family Characeae.

It has almost cosmopolitan distribution.

References

Charophyta